Lairdsville is a hamlet  in Oneida County, in the U.S. state of New York. It is located within the town of Westmoreland and is on NY Route 5.

History
A post office called Lairdsville was established in 1824, and remained in operation until it was discontinued in 1900. The community was named for Samuel Laird, an early settler.

References

Hamlets in Oneida County, New York